The 1916 St. Louis Cardinals season was the team's 35th season in St. Louis, Missouri and its 25th season in the National League. The Cardinals went 60–93 during the season and finished tied for seventh and last in the National League.

Rogers Hornsby became a regular in the Cardinals lineup starting in 1916. Hornsby played at least one game at each infield position. He immediately established himself as one of the league's leading hitters, finishing the 1916 season fourth in the batting race with a .313 average, and smacking 15 triples, one short of the league's lead.

Regular season

Season standings

Record vs. opponents

Roster

Player stats

Batting

Starters by position 
Note: Pos = Position; G = Games played; AB = At bats; H = Hits; Avg. = Batting average; HR = Home runs; RBI = Runs batted in

Other batters 
Note: G = Games played; AB = At bats; H = Hits; Avg. = Batting average; HR = Home runs; RBI = Runs batted in

Pitching

Starting pitchers 
Note: G = Games pitched; IP = Innings pitched; W = Wins; L = Losses; ERA = Earned run average; SO = Strikeouts

Other pitchers 
Note: G = Games pitched; IP = Innings pitched; W = Wins; L = Losses; ERA = Earned run average; SO = Strikeouts

Relief pitchers 
Note: G = Games pitched; W = Wins; L = Losses; SV = Saves; ERA = Earned run average; SO = Strikeouts

External links
1916 St. Louis Cardinals at Baseball Reference
1916 St. Louis Cardinals team page at www.baseball-almanac.com

St. Louis Cardinals seasons
Saint Louis Cardinals season
St Louis